The Man Who Wasn't There is a novel by Pat Barker, published in 1989. It is the story of a 1950s latch-key kid and his search for a father.

References

Novels set in the 1950s
1989 British novels
Novels by Pat Barker
Virago Press books